Giheung-gu is a gu (district) in Yongin, South Korea. It has 10 dong (neighborhoods). Its area is 81.67 km² and it has 439.877 inhabitants (in 2022). Giheung-gu was formed in 2005. It was formed with other gu in Yongin in 2005.

Administrative divisions
Giheung-gu is divided into the following "dong"s.
Giheung-dong (divided in turn into Gomae-dong and Gongse-dong)
Sanggal-dong (divided in turn into Sanggal-dong, Bora-dong and Jigok-dong)
Singal-dong (divided in turn into Singal-dong, Hagal-dong and Yeongdeok-dong)
Guseong-dong (divided in turn into Eonnam-dong and Cheongdeok-dong)
Dongbaek-dong (divided in turn into Dongbaek-dong and Jung-dong)
Seonong-dong (combination of Seocheon-dong and Nongseo-dong)
Gugal-dong
Mabuk-dong
Bojeong-dong
Sangha-dong

List of Gu in Yongin
 Cheoin-gu
 Suji-gu

Gallery

References 

Districts of Yongin